The New Al Grey Quintet is an album by trombonist Al Grey which was recorded and released on the Chiaroscuro label in 1988.

Reception

The AllMusic review by Scott Yanow stated "The repertoire mixes together swing standards with lesser-known jazz tunes ... The relaxed straight-ahead music flows nicely and all of the musicians (other than Durham) have their opportunities to be featured. Worth searching for".

Track listing
All compositions by Al Grey except where noted
 "Bluish Grey" (Thad Jones) – 5:03
 "Sonny's Tune" (Sonny Stitt) – 5:02
 "Don't Blame Me" (Dorothy Fields, Jimmy McHugh) – 6:11
 "Syrup and Biscuits" (Hank Mobley) – 5:48
 "'Tain't No Use" (Al Cohn) – 5:19
 "Al's Rose" – 3:09
 "Night and Day" (Cole Porter) – 2:21
 "Call It Whatchawanna" (Johnny Griffin) – 5:45
 "Underdog" (Cohn) – 5:49
 "Stompin' at the Savoy" (Edgar Sampson, Benny Goodman, Andy Razaf, Chick Webb) – 3:24		
 "Al's Blues" – 4:18
 "Rue Prevail" (Art Farmer) – 6:34
 "Soap Gets in Your Eyes" (Don Friedman) – 3:25

Personnel
Al Grey, Mike Grey - trombone
Joe Cohn – guitar, trumpet
J. J. Wiggins – bass
Bobby Durham – drums

References

Chiaroscuro Records albums
Al Grey albums
1988 albums
Albums recorded at Van Gelder Studio